In Dread Response is a New Zealand metal band from Auckland formed in 2005 commonly referred to as "In Dread" or "IDR".

In Dread has released three full-length studio albums and two EPs. Their video Cannons At Dawn from the album From the Oceanic Graves won the 2010 Juice TV Awards category Best Metal Video. In Dread have performed at GTaranaki 2010 alongside acts such as Slash. Their early EPs and first 2 albums have a sound that fuse Melodic Death Metal and Thrash Metal along with a few Doom Metal elements present. Their third album, "Heavenshore" was released independently and on Grind House Records in Japan in 2016 followed by a Tour of Japan to commemorate the signing.

Members
Current members
 Steve Boag - Bass
 Corey Friedlander - Drums
 Trajan M. Schwencke - Guitars
 William Cleverdon (2015–present)
 Ben Read - Vocals (2014–present)

Former members
 Michael Exton - Bass
 Matthew Berry - Bass
 Nikolas Kissel - Drums
 Alex Bird - Drums
 David Wilson - Drums
 Ross McDougall - Guitars
 Andhe Chandler - Guitars
 Sean O'Kane Connolly - Vocals

Discography
 Forgotten Wasteland  EP (2005)
 In the Arms of the Absurd  EP (2007)
 From the Oceanic Graves LP (2008)
 Embers in the Spiritless Void LP (2011)
 Heavenshore LP (2015)

References

External links
Official website

2006 EPs
2009 albums
New Zealand death metal musical groups